Mioni is a surname of Italian origin. Notable people with the surname include:

Fabrizio Mioni (1930-2020), Italian actor
Mascha Mioni (born 1941), artist name of a Swiss painter and textile artist

Surnames of Italian origin